Voldemar Panso (30 November 1920 Tomsk, Russia – 27 December 1977 Tallinn) was Estonian stage director, actor and theatrical teacher.

1941 he graduated from Tallinn Conservatory State Stage Art School and 1955 Moscow State Theatre Art Institute.

1941-1950 he was Estonian Drama Theatre actor. 1955-1958 he was stage director and 1970-1976 head stage director. 1957-1977 he directed Tallinn State Conservatory Stage Art Department.

He was one of the founders of the ESSR State Youth Theatre and 1965-1970 its first head stage director.

References

1920 births
1977 deaths
Estonian theatre directors
Estonian male stage actors
Estonian male film actors
20th-century Estonian male actors
Estonian Academy of Music and Theatre alumni
Soviet theatre directors
Soviet male actors